Richard Milton McKenna (May 9, 1913 – November 1, 1964) was an American sailor and novelist. He was best known for his historical novel The Sand Pebbles, which tells the story of an American sailor serving aboard a gunboat on the Chinese Yangtze River in 1925.

Biography

Early life
McKenna was born in Mountain Home, Idaho, on May 9, 1913.

Seeking more opportunities than could be found in such a rural part of the country at the height of the Great Depression, McKenna joined the U.S. Navy in 1931 at the age of 18. He served for 22 years, including 10 years of active sea duty. He served in World War II and the Korean War.

He retired as a Chief Machinist's Mate. Because of the benefits of the GI Bill, McKenna was able to attend college at the University of North Carolina at Chapel Hill, located in Chapel Hill, North Carolina, where he studied creative writing. He also married a librarian, Eva, whom he met at the college.

Writing career
McKenna began his writing career publishing science fiction, and starting in 1958 he regularly attended the annual Milford Writer's Workshop for science fiction writers.  "He had enormous talent," writes his colleague Ben Bova in the book Notes to a Science Fiction Writer. His first science fiction story "Casey Agonistes" immediately established him as a writer to be watched when it appeared in the September 1958 issue of The Magazine of Fantasy and Science Fiction. Only a handful of his science fiction tales were published during his lifetime, but after his death several more appeared posthumously.

McKenna's major work was The Sand Pebbles (1962), a 597-page novel later made into the well-known 1966 film of the same title. The protagonist was an enlisted career sailor on a U.S. Navy river gunboat named the San Pablo in China during the 1920s. McKenna himself served aboard a river gunboat on the Yangtze Patrol, but about ten years after the events in his novel and of more modern construction (San Pablo was an ancient gunboat seized from the Spanish in 1898). The Sand Pebbles won the $10,000 1963 Harper Prize Novel and was chosen as a Book-of-the-Month Club selection.

Shortly after the movie deal was announced, McKenna appeared on the television quiz program “To Tell The Truth”, receiving one vote from the celebrity panel. 

McKenna's posthumously published short story "The Secret Place" won the Nebula Award for Best Short Story in 1966 and was nominated for the Hugo Award for Best Short Story in 1967. Casey Agonistes and Other Science Fiction and Fantasy Stories (1973) collects the title story and four other short works: "Hunter Come Home", "The Secret Place", "Mine Own Ways", and "Fiddler's Green". The collections The Sons of Martha and The Left Handed Monkey Wrench were also published posthumously.

Death
McKenna died at his Chapel Hill N.C. home on November 4, 1964, at age 51.

Bibliography
 The Sand Pebbles (1962)
 "The Secret Place" (1966)
 Casey Agonistes and Other Science Fiction and Fantasy Stories (1973, collection)
The Sons of Martha (1973, collection)
 The Left Handed Monkey Wrench (collection)
 New Eyes for Old (collection of non-fiction writings)

References

External links 

1913 births
1964 deaths
20th-century American novelists
American male short story writers
American science fiction writers
American male novelists
Nebula Award winners
People from Mountain Home, Idaho
University of North Carolina at Chapel Hill alumni
Novelists from Idaho
Novelists from North Carolina
20th-century American short story writers
20th-century American male writers
United States Navy personnel of World War II
United States Navy personnel of the Korean War
United States Navy sailors